Dejan Zlatičanin (born 23 April 1984) is a Montenegrin professional boxer. He is the first Montenegrin to win a boxing world title, having held the WBC lightweight title from 2016 to 2017.

Professional career
Zlatičanin made his professional debut on 3 May 2008, scoring a third-round technical decision against Wladimir Borov. On 1 February 2011, he won his first regional championship—the vacant WBC Mediterranean lightweight title—via unanimous decision (UD) over Felix Lora. Later that year, on 26 November, he upgraded to the vacant WBC International title with a UD over Godfrey Nzimande, after which two successful defences were made between 2012 and 2013.

Zlaticanin vs. Burns 
On 27 June 2014, Zlatičanin regained the same title (now vacant) by knocking down and winning an upset split decision against former world champion Ricky Burns.

Zlaticanin vs. Mamani 
The pinnacle of Zlatičanin's career came on 11 June 2016, when he became the first Montenegrin world boxing champion by stopping Franklin Mamani in three rounds to win the vacant WBC lightweight title.

Zlaticanin vs. Garcia 
Zlatičanin would lose the WBC lightweight title in his first title defense against Mikey Garcia, on January 28, 2017. Garcia was ranked #2 by the WBC at lightweight. He was knocked out in the third round by a massive right hand from Garcia, and remained unconscious on the canvas for several minutes afterwards.

Zlaticanin vs. Abdullaev 
On 11 September 2021, Zlaticanin faced Zaur Abdullaev, who was ranked #6 by the WBC and #10 by the IBF at lightweight. Zlaticanin lost the bout via unanimous decision, with all three judges scoring the fight in favor of Abdullaev, 119–109, 118–110 and 117–111.

Zlaticanin vs. Ritson 
In his next bout, Zlaticanin fought Lewis Ritson. Ritson was consistently outboxed Zlaticanin throughout the fight and earned a unanimous decision victory, 100–90 twice and 99–91 in his favour.

Professional boxing record

References

External links

Q&A: Dejan Zlaticanin, post-Ricky Burns win by The Ring magazine
Dejan Zlaticanin - Profile, News Archive & Current Rankings at Box.Live

1984 births
Living people
Sportspeople from Podgorica
Montenegrin male boxers
Lightweight boxers
World Boxing Council champions
World lightweight boxing champions